San Giovanni Battista is a Gothic Revival-style, Roman Catholic church in Marsciano, in the province of Perugia, Umbria, Italy.

History
The present church in brick and stone replaced a 14th-century structure, utilizing some of the spolia. It has a large rose window and a unilateral campanile. The interiors contain a 13th-century painted crucifix, a 16th-century Madonna and Child and a painting depicting the Incredulity of St Thomas (1831) by Vincenzo Chialli.

References

Churches in the province of Perugia
Gothic Revival church buildings in Italy
19th-century Roman Catholic church buildings in Italy
Roman Catholic churches completed in 1896
1896 establishments in Italy